The University of Science and Technology of Mazandaran is a public university under the Ministry of Science located in east Mazandaran province in Iran.

The university offers undergraduate and postgraduate degrees in mathematics, electrical engineering, chemical engineering, and industrial engineering. Also undergraduate students in computer science, computer engineering and civil engineering.

It has three faculties:

The Faculty of Mathematics, [1] School of Electrical and Computer Engineering, and Chemical and Industrial Engineering. The university is headed by Hamid Mohammadzadeh, a member of the faculty of mathematics.

The university has 4 cultural, and religious centers that can be mentioned as the center of photography and film, art, Al-Zahra school and so on.

History and introduction 

Mazandaran University of Science and Technology, located 1 km away from the four seaside road of Behshahr city, started as a satellite unit of the Iran University of Science and Technology, in the year 5, with the admission of two students in two fields of industrial and electrical engineering.

The unit was renamed the Higher Education Center in the course of its independence from the University of Science and Technology of Iran and the Mazandaran University of Science and Technology in 2007. Following the independence of the university and following the follow-up by the university authorities, the number of courses was increased to 4 and the number of students was increased to 4 persons, and financial, cultural and student and educational, research and technology departments were established.

After the independence of Mazandaran University of Science and Technology, two administrative, student and cultural support departments and educational and research departments were first included in the organizational chart of the university. ۶ Separated from administrative and support departments and started as a new assistant to the university. Since its independence, the university has succeeded in building educational and welfare facilities and facilities.

See also
Higher education in Iran
Air tour
University map

References

https://en.mazust.ac.ir/

https://mazust.ac.ir/

https://mazust.ac.ir/Page/DataPage/2/%D8%A7%D8%B9%D8%B6%D8%A7%DB%8C-%D9%87%DB%8C%D8%A7%D8%AA-%D8%B9%D9%84%D9%85%DB%8C-%D8%AF%D8%A7%D9%86%D8%B4%DA%AF%D8%A7%D9%87-%D8%B9%D9%84%D9%85-%D9%88-%D9%81%D9%86%D8%A7%D9%88%D8%B1%DB%8C

https://en.mazust.ac.ir/Data/Pages

https://mazust.ac.ir/Content/Page/307/%D8%AF%D8%B1%D8%A8%D8%A7%D8%B1%D9%87-%D8%AF%D8%A7%D9%86%D8%B4%DA%AF%D8%A7%D9%87

https://mazust.ac.ir/Content/Page/309/%D9%86%D9%82%D8%B4%D9%87-%D8%AF%D8%A7%D9%86%D8%B4%DA%AF%D8%A7%D9%87

External links
 

Sci
Education in Mazandaran Province
Buildings and structures in Mazandaran Province